"Now and Later" is a song by American rapper Sage the Gemini. It was released on October 14, 2016, as the lead single from his debut mixtape, Morse Code (2017). The song was used in a popular Snapchat filter.

Background
In an interview with Genius, Sage the Gemini spoke on the creation process behind the song:

I was working with APG (Artist Publishing Group) for a very long time and I remember when I was like 19, we tried to come up with a candy song but we just could not do it. Obviously it was very hard since it took me almost like five years to get it nailed. I don’t follow blueprints or whatever. So it just came to me. I wasn't like 'Ooh, I'm going to do this kind of song.' I heard it and as soon as they played it for me I was like 'This is a hit.' I went down there, told him to cut my microphone on, and I just started flowing out of my mind.

Music video
The song's accompanying music video premiered on December 3, 2016, on Sage's YouTube account.

Commercial performance
"Now and Later" debuted on the Bubbling Under R&B/Hip-Hop Singles chart after it was featured in promotion as a Snapchat filter in late November 2016. It later peaked at number 93 on US Billboard Hot 100 for the week of February 25, 2017.

Charts

Weekly charts

Year-end charts

Certifications

References

External links

2016 singles
2016 songs
Sage the Gemini songs
Songs written by Sage the Gemini
Atlantic Records singles
Song recordings produced by Joe London